Alissa Leanne Bjerkhoel (pronounced byeer-kul) is an American litigation coordinator at the California Innocence Project (CIP), a law school clinic that investigates cases of factual innocence while training law students. Bjerkhoel was born in Truckee, California, and later graduated  from California Western School of Law (CWSL) after previously obtaining a B.A. degree She has been an attorney with CIP since 2008. Bjerkhoel has served as counsel for CIP on numerous criminal cases, and achieved the legal exoneration of a number of convicted prisoners. Bjerkhoel serves as CIP's in-house DNA expert and also serves as a panel attorney with the nonprofit law firms Appellate Defenders, Inc. (ADI) and Sixth District Appellate Program (SDAP). She is a member of the American Academy of Forensic Sciences. Bjerkhoel has won a number of awards. 

In 2013, Bjerkhoel walked from San Diego to Sacramento to protest the incarceration of twelve inmates she considered innocent, and presented twelve petitions for the convicted to the governor. to raise awareness of the issue of the wrongly convicted.

Legal education
After graduating from the University of California, Santa Barbara with a B.A. degree in history in 2004, Bjerkhoel entered California Western School of Law in 2005. In her second year at CWSL, Bjerkhoel became a clinical intern with the program, continued to work on cases in her third year and, after graduation in 2008, became one of CIP's first full-time staff attorneys.

In the fall of 2007, Bjerkhoel went to the Defensoría Penal Pública de Santiago in Santiago, Chile, to assist the institution's education department in training new public defenders. She taught were how to conduct direct examination, cross-examination, the opening statement and the closing argument. She drafted a comprehensive treatise, in both English and Spanish, for the Defensoría detailing the history, rules, examples and cases of Criminal Procedure and the Federal Rules of Evidence. She also organized and presented a seminar ("A Pragmatic Approach to Evidence") to the Defensoría, Ministereo Público, judges and the media. While in Chile, Bjerkhoel met with indigenous Mapuche people, as their lawyers discussed the legal problems of these peoples, who are located in Chile's southern regions.

Immediately prior to her work with CIP, Bjerkhoel worked as a judicial extern for Judge Jan Adler of the United States District Court for the Southern District of California. In that capacity, she evaluated pro se writs of habeas corpus and drafted and submitted report and recommendations on the merits of writs. She observed the inner workings of the federal judicial system by attending criminal calendar, observed initial negotiation and settlement conferences, and attended trials on civil rights violations.

CIP work

Responsibilities
Bjerkhoel currently holds the position of Litigation Coordinator at the California Innocence Project, investigating claims of wrongful conviction for felony convictions in Southern California. She serves as the in-house DNA expert, authors petitions filed on behalf of the Project's clients, directs and supervises clinical student casework, and coordinates case litigation. She communicates regularly with clients, attorneys, witnesses, victims, experts and law enforcement officials. She conducts field investigations, including visits to crime scenes, courts, correctional facilities and police stations. She drafts petitions for writ of habeas corpus and motions for DNA testing for cases where strong evidence of innocence exists. She also participates as co-counsel in evidentiary hearing and trial proceedings. In addition to her own case load, she supervises more than 100 cases each year.

Prominent cases

Brian Banks
The 2002 conviction of All Star linebacker Brian Banks on false charges of rape and kidnapping was dismissed in 2012, directly due to the efforts of the California Innocence Project. Following his initial arrest for the alleged crimes, Banks, despite his protestations of innocence, faced a possible conviction, if the case had gone to trial, of 41-years-to-life, and reluctantly agreed to a plea bargain. He was then given an unexpectedly harsh sentence of six years in prison (of which he served five years and two months), followed by five years' probation and registration as a sex offender.

After his release on probation, he arranged for a meeting with his accuser, Wanetta Gibson (who had contacted him through Facebook), at which she admitted on video that there had been no rape or kidnapping in 2002, and that their encounter had been completely consensual. The video evidence was not admissible in court, because the video had been made without Gibson's knowledge or consent and was not accompanied by a signed confession from the young woman. However, CIP was instrumental in putting together additional evidence supporting Banks' story, which led the district attorney to dismiss all charges against him and release him from sex-offender status, allowing him to resume his aborted sports career. Bjerkhoel was present in the courtroom with Banks on May 24, 2012, the day that his conviction was finally dismissed.

Banks supports CIP in its efforts on behalf of the wrongly-convicted, including participating in CIP's 2013 Innocence March. He often wears a shirt with the lettering "XONR8" ("exonerate"). A film project based on Banks' story, co-executive produced by Banks himself and Justin Brooks of CIP and to be directed by Tom Shadyac, is currently being developed, with actress Tiffany Dupont cast in the role of Bjerkhoel.

Timothy Atkins

In July, 1987, Timothy Atkins was convicted of one count of murder and two counts of robbery. The police were led to Atkins when a woman named Denise Powell, a prostitute, told police that Atkins had confessed to her to being an accomplice in the killing of a man who had been shot in the chest during an attempted carjacking. CIP co-founder and director Justin Brooks said, "The jury sees this young black kid... this woman says, 'yeah, I think that's the guy,' and he goes away for twenty-three years."

Powell later testified that she had fabricated the story of Atkins's confession. She recanted her testimony, saying that she had lied to police about the confession and had been afraid the lie would be revealed if she changed her story. In his decision, the judge stated that Powell's recantation, together with the "unreliable and changing [eye-witness] identification" led him to believe that "no reasonable judge or jury would have convicted Atkins." He was exonerated in February 2007 after more than 20 years in prison.

Reggie Cole
In 1994, Reggie Cole was convicted of the shooting of Felipe Angeles after being misidentified by an eyewitness, a local brothel owner. The police allege that the killer was shot in the leg upon leaving the scene and, after finding a gunshot wound in Cole's leg, concluded that he was the perpetrator. However, despite the fact that medical records were produced that proved Cole had actually received his leg wound six years prior, he was convicted.

CIP filed a petition for writ of habeas corpus on behalf of Cole alleging that Cole's trial attorney failed to investigate and present exculpatory evidence; the prosecution withheld material, exculpatory evidence; false evidence was introduced against Cole at his trial; and the prosecutor engaged in misconduct.   On April 8, 2009, Deputy District Attorney Hyman Sisman conceded on Cole's habeas petition that Cole received ineffective assistance of counsel and on April 15, 2009, Judge Jerry E. Johnson of the Los Angeles Superior Court vacated the murder conviction. Reggie Cole was exonerated after spending 16 years in prison.

Daniel Larsen
Based largely on eyewitness identification by two police officers, Daniel Larsen was convicted in 1999 of being in possession of a concealed knife under California's Three Strikes Law. Because he had prior felony convictions, Larsen was sentenced to 28 years to life in prison. The California Innocence Project, which began representing Larsen in 2002, found witnesses, including a former chief of police and the actual owner of the knife, who testified seeing a different man holding the knife. In 2010, a judge ordered Larsen's release, finding that he was "actually innocent" of the crime and that Larsen's constitutional rights were violated, because his attorney was incompetent.

Despite the ruling, Larsen remained in prison for two more years while state attorney general Kamala Harris challenged the judge's ruling because Larsen had missed the appeal deadline. In September 2013, the 9th U.S. Circuit Court of Appeals upheld the lower court ruling and freed Larsen after 14 years in prison.

Kimberly Long
Kim Long was convicted of murdering her boyfriend in 2003, and her case was received by the California Innocence Project in 2009. After many years of extensive investigation, research and forensic testing, the CIP became certain of Long's innocence. The case was assigned to Bjerkhoel, who worked on it for a total of seven years. The prosecution's case hinged on the testimony of a single witness, a friend of Long's, who had claimed that, on the night of the murder, he had dropped Long off at the apartment that she and the victim shared, at a time which the prosecution claimed would have allowed Long a window of opportunity sufficient to have committed the crime – and concealed her involvement – before calling 911 to report the death. (Since the witness had died in an unrelated accident shortly after providing his testimony, he could not be cross-examined.)

However, the CIP provided forensic proof that the victim had been killed prior to the witness' alleged drop-off time for Long (that is, before the earliest possible time of her return to the apartment), and that, even if the victim had actually been killed after that point in time, Long would not have had enough time to murder her boyfriend and hide evidence of that fact from police. DNA from an unknown male was also recovered at the crime scene. The evidence of her innocence was so compelling that the very same judge who heard the original case reversed the conviction in June 2016.

Guy Miles
Bjerkhoel helped defend Guy Miles, who was wrongly convicted of robbery. She explained in a television interview why Miles was being kept in prison despite strong evidence of his innocence. "The problem is the judge [in the case] didn't understand... about the [fallible] eyewitness identifications, and about how there is scientific evidence now showing that there's a very serious problem in our justice system with these stranger eyewitness identifications."

Therefore, despite the fact that Miles had numerous witnesses to provide an alibi for his whereabouts at the time of the crime, and the fact that three men who were indisputably guilty of the robbery confessed that Miles had had absolutely nothing to do with the crime, the judge in the case refused to exonerate Miles, maintaining that the eyewitness identifications were strong and rejecting the argument of California Innocence Project attorneys that they were not. Miles was finally freed in June 2017 after 18 years in prison, following a second hearing that reversed his earlier conviction.

Uriah Courtney
Courtney was found guilty of the kidnapping and rape of a young woman in November 2004, based almost entirely on eyewitness identifications. The CIP began investigating his case in 2010. At the time of his trial, DNA evidence taken from the victim's clothing proved inconclusive. However, subsequent advances in DNA technology prompted CIP to request that the victim's clothes be tested again, and a male profile was obtained. That profile was run through the Combined DNA Index System (CODIS), resulting in a positive identification of a local man with, as CIP said in a press release, "a striking physical resemblance to Courtney." Courtney was released from prison in June 2013. Said Bjerkhoel: "The National Institute of Justice has funded us to do DNA testing in cases such as this because identifications have often proved to be faulty. Flawed identification is the leading cause of wrongful convictions."

Bjerkhoel has referred to this case in presentations she has given regarding non-traditional DNA cases and the inherent flaws involved in witness identifications (see below).

Horace Roberts
Horace Roberts, a supervisor at a diagnostic lab, was convicted, after three trials, of second-degree murder in the 1998 strangulation death of Terry Cheek, a co-worker with whom the married Roberts had been having an affair. The victim herself had been married to Googie Harris, Sr., who knew about the affair, had filed a restraining order against Cheek and had demanded custody of their daughters. The evidence that had swayed the jury at the third trial was the presence, about a mile from the murder scene, of Roberts’ truck (which Cheek had frequently borrowed), the fact that he had initially lied about the affair with Cheek to police and, above all, the presence near the body of a watch that Roberts had mistakenly identified as his. (Roberts’ watch was later found at his home.) Harris, the victim's husband, testified against Roberts at each of his three trials and later opposed Robert's release from prison at his parole hearings.

Roberts also had an alibi: on the day of the murder, he had placed multiple calls to Cheek from a pay phone near his home. The CIP decided that the evidence that convicted Roberts was circumstantial and decided to take on the case.
 
In 2016, a request by the CIP for new DNA testing, more sophisticated than what was done in 1998, was granted. DNA from the victim's left-hand fingernails and clothes matched to Harris’ nephew, Joaquin Leal, who had served prison time on a molestation case against the child of a woman with whom Harris was then having a relationship. Meanwhile, the CIP lobbied the legislature, in line with other states, to reduce the legal evidentiary standard, which would make the original 2014 DNA evidence to the judge sufficient to exonerate Roberts. The legislature passed this reform in September 2016.

All this evidence was brought to the attention of Riverside District Attorney Mike Hestrin's Conviction Review Committee. Because of the DNA match, Leal and Harris then became the focus of a new probe. On October 2, 2018, the office agreed to reverse Roberts’ conviction. Ten days later, all charges against Roberts were dismissed, and on October 15, the D.A.’s office agreed to a Finding of Factual Innocence in Roberts’ case. A tweet showing Roberts released from prison on that day and featuring Bjerkhoel appeared on the CIP's Twitter account. On the same day, the D.A.’s office filed charges in the murder of Terry Cheek against Harris and Leal.

Under the law, wrongfully convicted inmates such as Roberts are entitled to receive $140 for each day incarcerated, which would add up to over $1 million for his nearly 20 years in prison.

The Innocence March
From April to June 2013, Bjerkhoel, CIP director Justin Brooks and managing attorney Michael Semanchik, along with many California Innocence Project exonerees and supporters, participated in an event they called "The Innocence March." Determined to gain clemency from Governor Jerry Brown for twelve convicted prisoners whom they deemed to be "100 percent innocent," as well as to gain public awareness of the plight of wrongfully convicted prisoners, they walked a 700-mile route from the CIP's offices in San Diego to the Capitol at Sacramento to formally present their petitions on behalf of the twelve to the governor.

"I could not be happier to complete this journey and bring attention to these cases," said Bjerkhoel to a journalist.

We would not walk over 700 miles for these people if they were guilty. The justice system has failed these people and they remain incarcerated even though they are innocent. We are confident, when the Governor reviews these cases, he will grant clemency and send them home to their families.

The marchers usually began each day's trek at about 5:30 am and covered about 20 miles by the end of each day, often in inclement weather and sometimes walking along railroad tracks and even through forests. Guy Miles' 80-year-old uncle marched twelve miles of the route with the group despite a leg injury. The team of attorneys met Miles himself at San Quentin prison during their journey. Adam Riojas, a CIP client freed after 14 years in prison, accompanied the marchers from San Diego to Oceanside, where he is now the pastor of a local chapel. Brian Banks joined the march at Malibu to lend his support so that other wrongfully-convicted prisoners could be released.

The march reached its destination in fifty-one days, four days earlier than the original 55-day schedule. In December of the same year, the California Innocence Project recreated the final (Sacramento) leg of the original march, from Raley Field to the governor's office at the Capitol. Although Gov. Brown did not grant clemency to any of the twelve, the march resulted in extensive press coverage. The Innocence March was selected by San Diego Magazine as one of the "27 Reasons to Love SD [San Diego] Now." Several of the prisoners named in the petition (including Guy Miles and Kim Long) have subsequently been freed through CIP's efforts.

Media appearances, abstracts and awards

Media appearances
Bjerkhoel has engaged in many interviews in print and broadcast media concerning her clients and her areas of legal expertise. The following is a sample of these appearances:

 KPBS Radio News: The California Innocence Project And The Freedom Of Reggie Cole (4/8/10)
 KPBS Radio News: After Eight Years In Prison, North Park Man Cleared Of Charges (6/24/13) [Uriah Courtney case]
 CV Independent: Guilty Until Proven Innocent: Kimberly Long Is in Prison for Killing Her Boyfriend. She Says She Didn't Do It — and the Evidence Is on Her Side (5/18/15)
 CV Independent: Finally Free: The California Innocence Project Gets Kimberly Long's Murder Conviction Overturned (8/26/16)
 ABC 20/20: Her Last Chance (10/07/2016) [Kimberly Long case]

Abstracts
The following are examples of abstracts and presentations authored or co-authored by Bjerkhoel from 2013 to 2017.

 Where Eyewitness Identifications Go Wrong and Where We Go From Here: Case Study of Uriah Courtney: American Academy of Forensic Sciences Conference (2014 - Seattle, WA)
 It's My Toy and You Can't Play With It: Defense Counsel Problems With Access to CODIS: American Academy of Forensic Sciences Conference (2015, Orlando, FL)

Awards
Bjerkhoel has won a number of awards, including: 
 Post-Conviction Lawyer of the Year - Criminal Defense Bar Association of San Diego (2006)
 Joe & Denise Walsh Excellence in Advocacy Award (2006) 
 Adrianne Baker Fellowship (2010)
 Young Attorney of the Year finalist (2011)
 California Lawyer Attorney of the Year, Criminal Division, 2012

Personal life
Bjerkhoel has been married to Steven Foley since 2015 and has a daughter. She lives in San Diego.

References

External links
California Western School of Law - San Diego

Living people
American lawyers
University of Southern California alumni
California Western School of Law alumni
Year of birth missing (living people)
People from Truckee, California